"Crazy Bitch" is the sixth single by American hard rock band Buckcherry, inspired by the infamous Paris Hilton sex tape 1 Night in Paris (2004). It was released as the first single from their third studio album 15 on January 31, 2006.

"Crazy Bitch" is the band's first single to hit the Billboard Hot 100 chart, debuting at No. 99 and peaking at No. 59. It earned a nomination for Best Hard Rock Performance at the 49th Annual Grammy Awards.

Background

Singer Josh Todd said the song was inspired by the 2004 Paris Hilton sex tape. He added, "That kind of sparked the idea. All the guys that we know have had crazy girls like that in their lives, so we wanted to write a song with an idea that people could latch on to." Guitarist Keith Nelson admitted that they didn't plan on "Crazy Bitch" being their first single, as evidenced by the amount of profanity which made the song very radio-unfriendly. However, satellite radio stations could play the song uncensored, and a few in New York City put the song on heavy rotation, garnering exposure.

Music videos 
The original music video was filmed at the Key Club in Los Angeles, which was made to look like a strip club. An open casting call (documented in a video on the band's site called "Behind the Bitch") was held, recruiting dancers and strippers for the low-budget video, which was directed by Ulf Buddensieck. The video exists in two versions: one X-rated, and the other a "clean" version that has been aired on Fuse TV. The "clean" version, however, was not approved by MTV, who demanded more than 80 cuts, according to the July 13, 2006 issue of Rolling Stone.

In October 2006, a new concept video was created for "Crazy Bitch" and the band's then-single "Next 2 You".

Controversy 
On September 11, 2006, a lawsuit was filed that alleges that a minor was given alcohol to drink and allegedly was filmed exposing her breasts, kissing another female and writhing against a pole while Buckcherry performed the song at the video shoot, which was later to be proven false. According to the lawsuit, the music video was posted on the band's website and distributed widely online, as was a "behind the scenes" program that referred to the girl's first name, featured more nudity and had band members saying, "It's like watching seven hours of porn." Skip Miller of law firm Miller Barondess said, "We had a guy at the door checking IDs, and to get in, this girl had to show a fake identification showing she was over 18.  There were signs telling minors to stay out. This woman filled out a release form with false information. And once it was determined this woman was underage, the video was removed." However, the lawsuit alleges that the minor was not asked for identification. Allen Kovac, Buckcherry's manager, said, "There was every opportunity for her not to be in that video. For whatever reason, the girl subverted those efforts, and now her mom is trying to blame everyone but her. This woman is now looking at them as a profit opportunity." A representative of Warner Music Group said it had no role in the video's original production, but that when the music company was contacted by the girl's mother, it immediately re-edited the video to exclude her and removed the original from circulation, hiring an outside group to strip it from websites that had posted it illegally.

Charts

Certifications

References 

Buckcherry songs
2006 singles
Songs written by Josh Todd
Songs written by Keith Nelson (musician)
Eleven Seven Label Group singles
Atlantic Records singles
Funk rock songs